The University of Rhode Island Botanical Gardens (4.5 acres) are botanical gardens located on the University of Rhode Island campus in Kingston, Rhode Island. The gardens are open to the public free of charge at all times.

The gardens were started as the Learning Landscape in 1992 as a donation of materials and labor from the Rhode Island Nursery and Landscape Association. The gardens were renamed the URI Botanical Gardens in 2003.

The URI Botanical Gardens showcase sustainable landscape plants and practices. The gardens feature a home garden and landscape, a Memorial White Garden, the Ericaceous Garden, the Annual Garden, the Formal Gardens and Graduation Stage, the Shade Garden, the Matthew J. Horridge Conservatory and the Chester Clayton Rose Garden.

See also 
 List of botanical gardens and arboretums in Rhode Island

External links 
 University of Rhode Island Botanical Gardens

Botanical gardens in Rhode Island
University of Rhode Island
Protected areas of Washington County, Rhode Island